One Day in the Life of Ivan Denisovich is a short novel by the Russian writer and Nobel laureate Aleksandr Solzhenitsyn, first published in November 1962 in the Soviet literary magazine Novy Mir (New World). The story is set in a Soviet labor camp in the early 1950s and features the day of prisoner Ivan Denisovich Shukhov.

The book's publication was an extraordinary event in Soviet literary history, since never before had an account of Stalinist repressions been openly distributed. Novy Mir editor Aleksandr Tvardovsky wrote a short introduction for the issue entitled "Instead of a Foreword".

Translations
At least five English translations have been made. Of those, Ralph Parker's translation (New York: Dutton, 1963) was the first to be published, followed by Ronald Hingley and Max Hayward's (New York: Praeger, 1963), Bela Von Block's (New York: Lancer 1963), and Gillon Aitken's (New York: Farrar Straus Giroux, 1971). The fifth translation, by H.T. Willetts (New York: Noonday/Farrar Straus Giroux, 1991), is the only one that is based on the canonical Russian text and the only one authorized by Solzhenitsyn. The English spelling of some character names differs slightly among the translations.

Plot
Ivan Denisovich Shukhov has been sentenced to a camp in the Soviet Gulag system. He was accused of becoming a spy after being captured briefly by the Germans as a prisoner of war during World War II.  Although innocent, he is sentenced to ten years in a forced labor camp.

The day begins with Shukhov waking up feeling unwell. For arising late, he is forced to clean the guardhouse, but this is a comparatively minor punishment. When Shukhov is finally able to leave the guardhouse, he goes to the dispensary to report his illness. It is relatively late in the morning by this time, however, so the orderly is unable to exempt any more workers and Shukhov must work.

The rest of the novel deals mainly with Shukhov's squad (the 104th, which has 24 members), their allegiance to the squad leader, and the work that the prisoners (zeks) do in hopes of getting extra food for their performance. For example, they are seen working at a brutal construction site where the cold freezes the mortar used for bricklaying if not applied quickly enough. Solzhenitsyn also details the methods used by the prisoners to survive; the whole camp lives by the rule of day-to-day survival.

Tyurin, the foreman of gang 104, is strict but kind, and the squad's fondness for him becomes more evident as the book progresses. Though a morose man, he is liked because he understands the prisoners, talks to them, and helps them. Shukhov is one of the hardest workers in the squad, possessing versatile skills that are in great demand, and he is generally well-respected. Rations are meager – prisoners only receive them on the basis of how productive their work units are (or the authorities think they have been) – but they are one of the few things that Shukhov lives for. He conserves the food that he receives and is always watchful for any item that he can hide and trade for food at a later date, or for favors and services he can do prisoners that they will thank him for in small gifts of food.

At the end of the day, Shukhov is able to provide a few special services for Tsezar (Caesar), an intellectual who does office work instead of manual labor. Tsezar is most notable, however, for receiving packages of food from his family.  Shukhov is able to get a small share of Tsezar's packages by standing in lines for him.  Shukhov reflects on his day, which was both productive and fortuitous for him. He did not get sick, his group had been assigned well paid work, he had filched a second ration of food at lunch, and he had smuggled into camp a small piece of metal he would fashion into a useful tool.

Main characters
The 104th is the labor-camp team to which protagonist Ivan Denisovich belongs. There are over 24 members, though the book describes the following characters the most thoroughly:
  (Иван Денисович Шухов), the protagonist of the novel. The reader is able to see Russian camp life through Shukhov's eyes, and information is given through his thoughts, feelings, and actions. Although the title refers to the main character by his given name, Ivan, and patronymic name, Denisovich (son of Denis), the character is primarily referred to by his surname, Shukhov.
  (Алёшка), a Baptist. He believes that being imprisoned is something that he has earned, since it allows him to reflect more on God and Jesus. Alyoshka, surprisingly, is able to hide part of a Bible in the barracks. Shukhov responds to his beliefs by saying that he believes in God but not heaven or hell, nor in spending much time on the issue.
   (Гопчик), a young member of the squad who works hard and for whom Shukhov has fatherly feelings, as he reminds Shukhov of his dead son. Gopchik was imprisoned for taking food to Ukrainian ultranationalists. Shukhov believes that Gopchik has the knowledge and adjustment skills to advance far at the camp.
  (Андрей Прокофьевич Тюрин), the foreman/squad leader of the 104th. He has been in the camp for  Tyurin likes Shukhov and gives him some of the better jobs, but he is also subject to the camp hierarchy; Tyurin must argue for better jobs and wages from the camp officers in order to please the squad, who then must work hard in order to please the camp officers and get more rations.
  (Фетюков), a member of the squad who has thrown away all of his dignity. He is particularly seen as a lowlife by Shukhov and the other camp members. He shamelessly scrounges for bits of food and tobacco.
Tzesar is a film director who was imprisoned before he could finish his first feature film. Some discussions in the novel indicate that he holds formalist views in art, which were probably the reason for his imprisonment. A cultured man, Tzesar discusses film with Buynovsky. His somewhat higher class background assures him food parcels.
  (Буйновский) also called "The Captain", a former Soviet Naval captain and a relative newcomer to the camp. Buynovsky was imprisoned after he received a gift from an admiral on a British cruiser on which he had served as a naval liaison. In the camp, Buynovsky has not yet learned to be submissive before the wardens.
  (Павло), a Ukrainian who serves as deputy foreman/squad leader and assists Tyurin in directing the 104th, especially when Tiurin is absent.
He speaks Russian like a native, having learned it in his childhood. Kilgas is popular with the team for making jokes.
  (Сенька Клевшин), a member of the 104th who became deaf from intense fighting during World War II. He escaped from the Germans three times and was recaptured each time, ending up in the Buchenwald concentration camp.

History
One Day is a sparse, tersely written narrative of a single day of the ten-year labor camp imprisonment of a fictitious Soviet prisoner, Ivan Denisovich Shukhov. Aleksandr Solzhenitsyn had first-hand experience in the Gulag system, having been imprisoned from 1945 to 1953 for writing derogatory comments in letters to friends about the conduct of the war by Joseph Stalin, whom he referred to by epithets such as "the master" and "the boss". Drafts of stories found in Solzhenitsyn's map case had been used to incriminate him (Frangsmyr, 1993). Solzhenitsyn claimed the prisoners wept when news of Stalin's death reached them. He uses the epithet batka usaty in his novel, which translates to "Old Whiskers" or "Old Man Whiskers". This title was considered offensive and derogatory, but prisoners were free to call Stalin whatever they liked: "Somebody in the room was bellowing: 'Old Man Whiskers won't ever let you go! He wouldn't trust his own brother, let alone a bunch of cretins like you!"

In 1957, after being released from the exile that followed his imprisonment, Solzhenitsyn began writing One Day. In 1962, he submitted his manuscript to Novy Mir, a Russian literary magazine. The editor, Aleksandr Tvardovsky, was so impressed with the detailed description of life in the labor camps that he submitted the manuscript to the Communist Party Central Committee for approval to publish it—until then Soviet writers had not been allowed to refer to the camps. From there it was sent to the de-Stalinist Nikita Khrushchev, who, despite the objections of some top party members, ultimately authorized its publication with some censorship of the text. After the novel was sent to the editor, Aleksandr Tvardovsky of Novy Mir, it was published in November 1962.

The labor camp featured in the book was one that Solzhenitsyn had served some time at, and was located in Karaganda in northern Kazakhstan.

Reception
One Day in the Life of Ivan Denisovich was specifically mentioned in the Nobel Prize presentation speech when the Nobel Committee awarded Solzhenitsyn the Nobel Prize in Literature in 1970.

Following the publication of One Day... Solzhenitsyn wrote four more books, three in 1963 and a fourth in 1966 which cataclysmically led to the controversy of his publications.  In 1968, Solzhenitsyn was accused by the Literary Gazette, a Soviet newspaper, of not following Soviet principles. The Gazette'''s editors also made claims that Solzhenitsyn was opposing the basic principles of the Soviet Union, his style of writing had been controversial with many Soviet literary critics especially with the publication of One Day ... .  This criticism made by the paper gave rise to further accusations that Solzhenitsyn had turned from a Soviet Russian into a Soviet enemy, therefore he was branded as an enemy of the state, who, according to the Gazette, had been supporting non-Soviet ideological stances since 1967, perhaps even longer.  He, in addition, was accused of de-Stalinisation. The reviews were particularly damaging.  Solzhenitsyn was expelled from the Soviet Writers' Union in 1969.  He was arrested, then deported in 1974.  

The novella had sold over 95,000 copies after it was released and throughout the 1960s. While Solzhenitsyn and his work were originally received negatively, under the leadership of Nikita Khrushchev, the book's mass publication was allowed to undermine the influence of Josef Stalin on the Soviet Union. Critics of this action argue that it unleashed liberalization that would cause the publication of more radical works and eventually the dissolution of the Soviet Union.

Influence
Vitaly Korotich declared: "The Soviet Union was destroyed by information – and this wave started from Solzhenitsyn's One Day".

Film

A one-hour dramatization for television, made for NBC in 1963, starred Jason Robards Jr. in the title role and was broadcast on November 8, 1963. A 1970 film adaptation based on the novella starred British actor Tom Courtenay in the title role.   Finland banned the film from public view, fearing that it could hurt external relations with its eastern neighbor.

See also

 In the Claws of the GPU, apparently the earliest ever Gulag memoir, published in 1935.
 The Gulag Archipelago Gulag: A History List of Nobel laureates in Literature

Notes

Sources
 Feuer, Kathryn (Ed). Solzhenitsyn: A collection of Critical Essays. (1976). Spectrum Books, 
 Moody, Christopher. Solzhenitsyn. (1973). Oliver and Boyd,  Edinburgh 
 Labedz, Leopold. Solzhenitsyn: A documentary record. (1970). Penguin 
 Scammell, Michael. Solzhenitsyn. (1986). Paladin. 
 Solzhenitsyn, Aleksandr. Invisible Allies. (Translated by Alexis Klimoff and Michael Nicholson). (1995). The Harvill Press 
 Grazzini, Giovanni. Solzhenitsyn. (Translated by Eric Mosbacher) (1971).  Michael Joseph, 
 Burg, David; Feifer, George. Solzhenitsyn: A Biography. (1972). 
 Medvedev, Zhores. 10 Years After Ivan Denisovich. (1973). Knopf, 
 Rothberg, Abraham. Aleksandr Solzhenitsyn: The Major Novels. (1971). Cornell University Press. 
  (preview)
 
 . In the early chapters, Solzhenitsyn describes how One Day came to be written and published.
 Nobel Lectures, Literature 1968-1980'', Editor-in-Charge Tore Frängsmyr, Editor Sture Allén, World Scientific Publishing Co., Singapore, 1993.

External links
 Text of One Day in the Life of Ivan Denisovich translated by H.T. Willets 
 Text of One Day in the Life of Ivan Denisovich 
 
 Audiobook 

1962 novels
1962 in the Soviet Union
Novels set in the Stalin era
Novels set in one day
Novels about political repression in the Soviet Union
Books critical of communism
Novels set in the Gulag
Novels by Aleksandr Solzhenitsyn
Works originally published in Novy Mir
20th-century Russian novels
Censored books
Novels set in prison
Novels set in the 1950s